The 1921 Lübeck state election was held on 13 November 1921 to elect the 80 members of the Bürgerschaft, the state parliament of the Free and Hanseatic City of Lübeck.

Results

References 

Lübeck
Elections in Schleswig-Holstein